Slasher may refer to:

 Slasher (basketball), a style of play in basketball
 Slasher film, a subgenre of the horror film
 Slasher (tool), a scrub-clearing implement
 Slasher (2004 film), a 2004 documentary film
 Slasher (2007 film), a 2007 horror film
 Slasher (TV series), a 2016 horror-drama TV series
 John Reis (born 1969), American musician, known by the pseudonym Slasher
 Los Angeles Slashers, a Slamball team

See also